Pelopidas mathias, the dark small-branded swift, small branded swift, lesser millet skipper or black branded swift, is a butterfly belonging to the family Hesperiidae. It is found throughout much of south, southeast and East Asia, and as far as the Philippines. It is also present in tropical Africa and Arabia.

Description

In 1891, Edward Yerbury Watson described it as:

Role in agriculture
P. mathias is considered a pest to rice-growing cultures, although it is not as damaging to rice plants as Parnara guttata. Newly hatched caterpillars are especially voracious in eating young seedlings. They also use silken threads to roll up and stitch together partially eaten leaves for more efficient consumption.

Subspecies
Pelopidas mathias mathias
Pelopidas mathias oberthueri Evans, 1937
Pelopidas mathias repetita (Butler, 1882) (Admiraly Island, Dampier Island, Vulcan Island)

References

Pelopidas (skipper)
Butterflies of Asia
Butterflies described in 1798
Butterflies of Singapore
Butterflies of Indochina
Insect pests of millets